Jörn Borowski (born 15 January 1959, in Rostock) is a German sailor who competed in the 1980 Summer Olympics. He is the son of Olympic medalist Paul Borowski.

References

1959 births
Living people
German male sailors (sport)
Olympic sailors of East Germany
Olympic silver medalists for East Germany
Olympic medalists in sailing
Medalists at the 1980 Summer Olympics
Sailors at the 1980 Summer Olympics – 470
Sportspeople from Rostock
World champions in sailing for Germany
470 class world champions